Fritz Hirschfeld (22 October 1886 in Berlin – 11 October 1944 in Auschwitz) was a German jurist of Jewish descent, a judge in Potsdam, a refugee in the Netherlands, interned in the Westerbork transit camp and in the Theresienstadt concentration camp and murdered in the Auschwitz extermination camp. After his conversion he also worked as a translator and author. 

In March 2019, a Stolperstein (stumbling stone) for Fritz Hirschfeld was laid in Nieuwkuijk in the Netherlands on the site of the St. Gertrudisgesticht which was demolished in 1969. Another stumbling stone has been in place since December 2019 in Potsdam, Griebnitzstraße 8. A hall in the Potsdam Regional Court has been named after him.

References

External links

1886 births
1944 deaths
German jurists
German people who died in Auschwitz concentration camp
Westerbork transit camp survivors
Theresienstadt Ghetto prisoners
German Jews who died in the Holocaust
Jewish emigrants from Nazi Germany to the Netherlands
Lists of stolpersteine in Germany